Edvard Grieg's String Quartet No. 1 in G minor, Op. 27, is the second of three string quartets written by the composer.  The first, in D minor, was an early work, now lost, written in the early 1860s at the request of his teacher, Carl Reinecke. The third quartet, in F major, remained incomplete at the composer's death.

Background

Grieg wrote the quartet in 1877–78, while living at a farm in Hardanger. He wrote to a friend "I have recently finished a string quartet which I still haven't heard. It is in G minor and is not intended to bring trivialities to market. It strives towards breadth, soaring flight and above all resonance for the instruments for which it is written."

The first performance of the quartet took place in Cologne in October 1878, by a quartet led by the work's dedicatee, violinist Robert Heckmann.

Publication of the quartet was delayed when the composer's preferred publisher, C.F. Peters, initially rejected the quartet because they believed the double stopping in some movements would require the work to be rewritten as a piano quartet or quintet. Grieg had to find another publisher, E.W. Fritzsch, and only after the success of that release did C.F. Peters publish their own edition.

Structure
The work has four movements and lasts around 35 minutes in performance.

 Un poco andante - Allegro molto ed agitato
 Romanze: Andantino
 Intermezzo: Allegro molto marcato - Più vivo e scherzando
 Finale: Lento - Presto al saltarello

Influence

English musicologist Gerald Abraham, writing in 1948, suggested that Claude Debussy's String Quartet, also in G minor, was either consciously or subconsciously modelled on Grieg's quartet. Debussy often disparaged Grieg's abilities as a composer and a pianist.

References

Footnotes

Sources

Grinde, Nils (n.d.), 'Grieg, Edvard (Hagerup): 7.Chamber Music' in Grove Music Online (subscription only) (accessed 31 March 2013)

External links
 
 
 

Compositions by Edvard Grieg
1878 compositions
Grieg01
Compositions in G minor